Columbia is a town in, and the parish seat of, Caldwell Parish, Louisiana, United States. The population was 277 in 2020.

History
The land that became Columbia was first cleared by Daniel Humphries in 1827. A store was built a few years later the only settlement between Monroe, Louisiana and the settlements of the Black River was formed. The harbor became a busy port for shipping cotton by steamboats and Packet boats until the arrival of the railroad. In February 1864 Columbia was the location of a skirmish between Federal and Confederate troops during the Civil War and there are several plantations in the area.

Geography
Columbia is located just east of the center of Caldwell Parish at  (32.104042, -92.076921), on the southwest bank of the Ouachita River. U.S. Route 165 passes through the center of town and bridges the river, leading north  to Monroe and south  to Alexandria.

Demographics

As of the 2020 United States census, there were 277 people, 152 households, and 107 families residing in the town.

Government and infrastructure
Law enforcement services are provided by the Columbia Police Department and the Caldwell Parish Sheriff's Office. Fire protection services are provided by the Columbia Volunteer Fire Department, and by other Volunteer Fire Departments across the parish when needed.

Notable people

 Buddy Caldwell, Attorney General of Louisiana, elected in 2007
 Graves B. Erskine, U.S. Marine Corps general; combat officer in World War I, having received the Silver Star and Purple Heart; U.S. Commander of the 3rd Marine Division in World War II in the Battle of Iwo Jima, having earned the Distinguished Service Medal
 J.D. DeBlieux, Louisiana State Senator representing East Baton Rouge Parish, 1956-1960 & 1964-1976
 Pam Kelly, recipient of the Wade Trophy in 1982; the title is awarded to the most valuable women's collegiate basketball player in the nation
 Lelon Kenney, Louisiana state representative, farmer, and businessman
 John J. McKeithen, governor of Louisiana (1964–1972);  Louisiana Public Service Commissioner (1955–1964); state representative (1948–1952); U.S. Army combat officer (1942–1945) in the 77th Infantry Division having received two Bronze Stars in the battles of Guam, Leyte, Okinawa and Ie Shima
 W. Fox McKeithen, Louisiana House of Representatives, 1984–1988; five-term Louisiana Secretary of State, 1988–2005; former teacher at Caldwell Parish High School
 Clay Parker, former pitcher for the New York Yankees & Seattle Mariners
 Neil Riser, state senator elected in 2007 from the 32nd District, which includes Caldwell Parish; the first Republican from this district since  Reconstruction
 Chet D. Traylor,  Louisiana Supreme Court, 1997–2009

Gallery

References

External links
 Columbia Progress Community Progress Site for Columbia, LA

Parish seats in Louisiana
Louisiana populated places on the Ouachita River
Towns in Caldwell Parish, Louisiana
Towns in Louisiana